Kohinoor most commonly refers to the Koh-i-Noor, a 105.6 metric carats diamond, weighing 21.6 g, once the largest known diamond.

Kohinoor may also refer to:

Companies
 Koh-i-Noor Hardtmuth, a writing instrument manufacturer
 Kohinoor Film Company, an Indian film studio established in 1918
 Kohinoor Group or Saigol Group, a Pakistani conglomerate

Media
 Kohinoor (1960 film), a 1960 Bollywood film
 Kohinoor (2015 film), a Malayalam film
 Kohinoor Theatre, a mobile theatre from Assam
 Kohinoor (TV series), a 2005 Indian television series
 Koh-i-Noor: The History of the World's Most Infamous Diamond, a 2017 non-fiction history book about the diamond
 The Kohinoor, a 19th century Bengali newspaper
 Kolkatay Kohinoor, a 2019 Indian film about the diamond
 Kohinoor karan, a fictional Indian superhero from the 1998 film Maharaja

Places
 Kohinoor, South Australia, a locality in the Kangaroo Island Council
 Koh-I-Noor railway station, Sheikhupura District, Punjab, Pakistan
 Kohinoor College of Hotel and Tourism Management, Mumbai, India
 Kohinoor-IMI School of Hospitality Management, Khandala, India
 Kohinoor Asiana Hotel now Elite Grand Hotel, Chennai, India

Other uses
 Amathuxidia amythaon, a kind of butterfly found in Asia, also known as koh-i-noor